Georgiev Georgi Liubomirov (born 12/06/1974, Ruse) is a sculptor from Bulgaria. In 1993 he graduated in the class of wood carving from the Art High School in Teteven. He continued his education at the University of Veliko Tarnovo, in the Sculpting course of Prof. Velichko Minekov. He received his master's degree at the National Art Academy, Sofia, in the class of Prof. Emil Popov. He is working in the field of figure composition, using classic materials - stone, wood, and metal. He has many solo exhibitions. He also participated in several international symposia, national exhibitions (DAE) and won several sculptural competitions.

Participations and exhibitions
Common project with Prof. Emil Popov for World Mask Festival in Pernik, Bulgaria, 2008
Symposium of Stone Sculpture, Ilindentsi, Bulgaria, 2008
Participations in the National Exhibitions, Sofia, 2004-2008
Participation in Wood Sculpture Symposium, Oddense, Denmark 2008,2010
Participations in the National Bulgarian Sculpture Exhibition, 2008, 2009, 2010
Solo exhibition, Vuzrajdane Gallery, Plovdiv, 2010
Solo exhibition, Ikar Gallery, Sofia, 2011

Awards
1st Place in Competition for Sculpture, traditionally given each year to students in Science, Sport and Art
1st Place in National Competition for Memorial Monument of Bulgarian poet Hristo Smirnenski
3rd Place in National Competition for Monument of Bulgarian poetess Petya Dubarova

External links
Article of author in ArtClue
Article of author in TheatreArt
Gallery of author 

1974 births
Living people
Bulgarian sculptors
20th-century Bulgarian artists
21st-century Bulgarian artists
20th-century sculptors
21st-century sculptors